Møre og Romsdal District Court is a district court located in Møre og Romsdal county, Norway. This court is based at four different courthouses which are located in Volda, Ålesund, Molde, and Kristiansund. The court serves the whole county which includes 26 municipalities. The court in Volda accepts cases from the municipalities of Herøy, Sande, Vanylven, Volda, and Ørsta. The court in Ålesund accepts cases from the municipalities of Fjord, Giske, Hareid, Stranda, Sykkylven, Sula, Ulstein, and Ålesund. The court in Molde accepts cases from the municipalities of Aukra, Hustadvika, Molde, Rauma, and Vestnes. The court in Kristiansund accepts cases from the municipalities of Aure, Averøy, Gjemnes, Kristiansund, Smøla, Sunndal, Surnadal, and Tingvoll. The court is subordinate to the Frostating Court of Appeal.

The court is led by a chief judge and several other judges. The court is a court of first instance. Its judicial duties are mainly to settle criminal cases and to resolve civil litigation as well as bankruptcy. The administration and registration tasks of the court include death registration, issuing certain certificates, performing duties of a notary public, and officiating civil wedding ceremonies. Cases from this court are heard by a combination of professional judges and lay judges.

History
This court was established on 26 April 2021 after the old Nordmøre District Court, Romsdal District Court, Sunnmøre District Court, and Søre Sunnmøre District Court were all merged into one court. The new district court system continues to use the courthouses from the predecessor courts.

References

District courts of Norway
2021 establishments in Norway
Organisations based in Kristiansund
Organisations based in Ålesund
Organisations based in Molde